Chiara Ferragni (born May 7, 1987) is an Italian blogger, businesswoman, fashion designer and model who has collaborated with fashion and beauty brands through her blog The Blonde Salad.

Biography 
Ferragni was born in Cremona in 1987. Ferragni is the oldest daughter of three girls, daughter of a dentist from the northern city of Cremona. Her mother Marina Di Guardo is an Italian writer from Sicily who also worked as deputy director of the Blumarine fashion house.

At the age of 16, she was hired by the Beatrice model agency in Milan, Italy. She modeled for the agency for a couple of years and then stopped, due to "other goals to reach in my life". She started her fashion blog "The Blonde Salad" in October 2009 with an ex-boyfriend, Riccardo Pozzoli. In December 2011, she was profiled as the Blogger of the Moment in Teen Vogue, while still a law student at Bocconi University. She has not obtained her University degree.

In December 2013, she published an Italian language eBook, under The Blonde Salad. She modelled for Guess in a November 2013 shoot that was subsequently marketed as an ad campaign. In December 2013 she collaborated with Steve Madden to design a 9-shoe collection for Spring 2014. Her business ventures grossed about $8 million (mostly from her Chiara Ferragni Collection footwear) in 2014.

Her television credits include the Italian TRL Awards as a presenter, and a guest appearance on the Italian variety show Chiambretti Night. She also appeared on Project Runway as a guest judge during season 13 in August 2014.

In January 2015, her blog and shoe line, Chiara Ferragni Collection, became a case study at Harvard Business School. In March, Ferragni was selected for the cover of the April 2015 Vogue España, making her the first fashion blogger to appear on any Vogue cover. Chiara appeared on Lucky magazine alongside Nicole Warne and Zanita Whittington. In January 2016, Pantene announced Ferragni was its new global ambassador. Mattel Inc. created a Barbie version of Ferragni in September 2016, one wearing a white T-shirt, black leather jacket, jeans and Chiara Ferragni Collection shoes and the other wearing a head to toe Chanel look.

, Ferragni had 10 million followers on Instagram. Because of her broad following, she was able to earn about $12,000 for a sponsored post to Instagram.  She also used her Social Media followership to campaign against the far right party in Italy. In 2017, Ferragni was chosen to design costumes for the 4th edition of Intimissimi on ice. On 26 July 2017, she opened her first Chiara Ferragni Collection store in Milan.

In June 2020, the Italian rapper Baby K published the summer hit "Non mi basta più" featuring Chiara Ferragni. Ferragni and her husband raised €3 million in 24 hours through a fundraiser to support the San Raffaele hospital in Milan during the COVID-19 pandemic in Italy. In April 2021, Ferragni joined the Board of Directors of Tod's Group. In May 2021, Ferragni unveiled the Nespresso × Chiara Ferragni collection on her social media. A temporary pop-up cafe was set up in celebration of the capsule. In 2022, she announced the launch of her own line of fragrance.

Recognition

Personal life 
Chiara Ferragni's net worth is estimated to be 19 million euros from the income of her three companies.

Ferragni and Italian rapper Federico Lucia, known as Fedez, started dating in late 2016 and got married on 1 September 2018 in Noto, Sicily. They have two children, Leone (born 19 March 2018 in West Hollywood, California) and Vittoria (born 23 March 2021 in Milan). They live in Milan.

Filmography

Television

Discography

References

External links 

Shoe design website
The Blonde Salad blog

1987 births
Living people
Fashion influencers
Italian bloggers
Italian expatriates in the United States
Italian female models
Italian women company founders
21st-century Italian businesswomen
21st-century Italian businesspeople
People from Cremona
People of Sicilian descent
Italian women bloggers